Pine Run may refer to:

 Pine Run Elementary School, Bucks County, Pennsylvania, a school in the Central Bucks School District
 Pine Run, Michigan
 Pine Run (James River), a stream in Stone County, Missouri
 Pine Run (Mill Creek, Neshaminy Creek, Delaware River), a small stream in Northampton Township, Bucks County, Pennsylvania
 Pine Run (North Branch Neshaminy Creek) a stream in Bucks County, Pennsylvania
 Pine Run (South Branch French Creek tributary), a stream in Erie County, Pennsylvania
 Pine Run (Neshannock Creek tributary), a stream in Mercer County, Pennsylvania

See also
 Pine Creek (disambiguation)